Heterobostrychus aequalis, known generally as oriental wood borer, is a species of horned powder-post beetle in the family Bostrichidae. Other common names include the lesser auger beetle (Australia) and oriental bostrichid. It is found in Africa, Australia, Europe and Northern Asia (excluding China), North America, Oceania, and Southern Asia.

References

Further reading

 
 
 

Bostrichidae
Articles created by Qbugbot
Beetles described in 1884